Jeremiah Radcliffe (died 1612) was an English priest, scholar and translator.

Radcliffe was educated at Westminster School and Trinity College, Cambridge. He became a Fellow of Trinity in 1572. He served as Vicar of Evesham from 1588 and Rector of Orwell, Cambridgeshire from 1590. From 1597 to 1611 he was Vice-Master of Trinity College. He also served in the "Second Cambridge Company" charged by James I of England with translating the Apocrypha for the King James Version of the Bible.

References

 Nicolson, Adam. (2003) God's Secretaries: The Making of the King James Bible. New York: HarperCollins 

Fellows of Trinity College, Cambridge
Year of birth missing
16th-century births
1612 deaths
16th-century translators
17th-century translators
Translators of the King James Version
16th-century English Anglican priests
17th-century English clergy
Jeremiah
16th-century scholars
17th-century scholars